

Archosauromorphs

Newly named phytosaurs

Newly named dinosaurs
Data courtesy of George Olshevsky's dinosaur genera list.

Protorosaurs

References